Marcus Cornelius Washington (born October 17, 1977) is a former American football linebacker. After completing his college career with Auburn he was drafted by the Indianapolis Colts in the second round of the 2000 NFL Draft. He was later signed by the Washington Redskins in 2004, and played there for five seasons.

Early years
Washington attended Auburn High School in Auburn, Alabama, where he lettered in both basketball and football.

College career
As a senior at Auburn University, Marcus Washington played defensive end and posted seven sacks and 52 tackles.

Professional career

Indianapolis Colts
He was drafted by the Indianapolis Colts with the 28th pick in the second round (59th overall) of the 2000 NFL Draft.  After four seasons as a linebacker with the Colts, they were unable to make him an offer because of the expected cost of re-signing Peyton Manning.

Washington Redskins
The Washington Redskins signed Washington on March 5, 2004. During his five-year tenure with the Redskins he made the Pro Bowl in 2004 and was named an alternate in 2005 and 2006.

Washington was released by the Redskins on February 20, 2009.

Coaching
He was the Defensive Line Coach for the University of San Diego football team in 2016. In that season, the Toreros ranked the #1 ranked scoring defense in the Football Championship Subdivision (FCS), averaging only 12.1 points allowed per game in the regular season.

NFL statistics

References
Bryant, Howard (January 1, 2006). "Washington Is Monumental". The Washington Post, p. E01.

1977 births
Living people
Sportspeople from Auburn, Alabama
Players of American football from Alabama
African-American players of American football
American football outside linebackers
Auburn High School (Alabama) alumni
Auburn Tigers football players
Indianapolis Colts players
Washington Redskins players
National Conference Pro Bowl players
21st-century African-American sportspeople
20th-century African-American sportspeople
Ed Block Courage Award recipients